The Tiitinen list is a Finnish classified government document which was given by West German Intelligence Service to the Finnish Security Police (Supo) in 1990. The list consists of the names of 18 persons who are suspected to have been in contact with the East German security service Stasi. The people are popularly described as having been suspected of spying for the Eastern Bloc. The list is named after Seppo Tiitinen, who was the head of Supo in 1990.

A copy of the list has been requested by journalist Susanna Reinboth and, in 2008, Supo was ordered to disclose the list by the Helsinki administrative court. In 2010, the ruling was overturned by the Supreme Court of Finland.

One major argument in keeping the list classified has been that it only specifies individuals who have allegedly been in contact with Stasi, but not the nature of the contact. Therefore being on the list would not constitute proof of or even indicate breaking any Finnish laws. Consequently it was chosen not to shame potentially innocent persons in the media.

In October 2010, Julian Assange said in an interview that WikiLeaks had received a set of eight documents making up the Tiitinen list, and that it was to be published by the website pending a factual review. The list is "one of the most sought-after documents that Wikileaks has", according to Assange.

References
Notes

General references
 Juha-Pekka Tikka, Ilta-Sanomat: This is what Tiitinen list is all about 
 Stasi articles from a Finnish newspaper Aamulehti 
 Der Einfluss der DDR auf Finnland (The impact of East Germany in Finland) Prof. Dr. Seppo Hentilä (in German)

Political history of Finland
Stasi
Classified documents